Claudio Galli (born 12 July 1965) is an Italian volleyball player. He competed at the 1988 Summer Olympics and the 1992 Summer Olympics.

References

External links
 
 
 
 

1965 births
Living people
Italian men's volleyball players
Olympic volleyball players of Italy
Volleyball players at the 1988 Summer Olympics
Volleyball players at the 1992 Summer Olympics
Sportspeople from Milan